In data processing R*-trees are a variant of R-trees used for indexing spatial information. R*-trees have slightly higher construction cost than standard R-trees, as the data may need to be reinserted; but the resulting tree will usually have a better query performance. Like the standard R-tree, it can store both point and spatial data.
It was proposed by Norbert Beckmann, Hans-Peter Kriegel, Ralf Schneider, and Bernhard Seeger in 1990.

Difference between R*-trees and R-trees

Minimization of both coverage and overlap is crucial to the performance of R-trees. Overlap means that, on data query or insertion, more than one branch of the tree needs to be expanded (due to the way data is being split in regions which may overlap). A minimized coverage improves pruning performance, allowing exclusion of whole pages from search more often, in particular for negative range queries.
The R*-tree attempts to reduce both, using a combination of a revised node split algorithm and the concept of forced reinsertion
at node overflow. This is based on the observation that R-tree structures are highly susceptible 
to the order in which their entries are inserted, so an insertion-built (rather than bulk-loaded) structure 
is likely to be sub-optimal. Deletion and reinsertion of entries allows them to "find" a place in the tree 
that may be more appropriate than their original location.

When a node overflows, a portion of its entries are removed from the node and reinserted into the tree.
(In order to avoid an indefinite cascade of reinsertions caused by subsequent node overflow, the reinsertion 
routine may be called only once in each level of the tree when inserting any one new entry.) This has the 
effect of producing more well-clustered groups of entries in nodes, reducing node coverage. Furthermore, 
actual node splits are often postponed, causing average node occupancy to rise.
Re-insertion can be seen as a method of incremental tree optimization triggered on node overflow.

Performance
Improved split heuristic produces pages that are more rectangular and thus better for many applications.
Reinsertion method optimizes the existing tree, but increases complexity.
Efficiently supports point and spatial data at the same time.

Algorithm and complexity
 The R*-tree uses the same algorithm as the regular R-tree for query and delete operations.
 When inserting, the R*-tree uses a combined strategy. For leaf nodes, overlap is minimized, while for inner nodes, enlargement and area are minimized.
 When splitting, the R*-tree uses a topological split that chooses a split axis based on perimeter, then minimizes overlap.
 In addition to an improved split strategy, the R*-tree also tries to avoid splits by reinserting objects and subtrees into the tree, inspired by the concept of balancing a B-tree.

Worst case query and delete complexity are thus identical to the R-Tree. The insertion strategy to the R*-tree is with  more complex than the linear split strategy of the R-tree, but less complex than the quadratic split strategy for a page size of  objects and has little impact on the total complexity. The total insert complexity is still comparable to the R-tree: reinsertions affect at most one branch of the tree and thus  reinsertions, comparable to performing a split on a regular R-tree. So on overall, the complexity of the R*-tree is the same as that of a regular R-tree.

An implementation of the full algorithm must address many corner cases and tie situations not discussed here.

References

External links
 

R-tree
Database index techniques

de:R-Baum